Olavi Kämäräinen (17 November 1922, Rauma – 8 August 2014) was a Finnish politician. He was a Member of the Parliament of Finland from 1962 to 1966, representing the Finnish People's Democratic League (SKDL). Kämäräinen was active in the Communist Party of Finland (SKP) as well.

References

1922 births
2014 deaths
People from Rauma, Finland
Communist Party of Finland politicians
Finnish People's Democratic League politicians
Members of the Parliament of Finland (1962–66)